This article is about the particular significance of the century 801–900 to Wales and its people.

Events

830
Approximate date – Nennius's Historia Brittonum
878 
Merfyn ap Rhodri succeeds his father Rhodri the Great as king of Powys, reigning until his own death in c.900
893
Spring – Battle of Buttington, a victory for a joint Anglo-Saxon and Welsh force against the Vikings; the Buttington Oak, planted about this time, perhaps to commemorate the event, falls in 2018
Autumn – Danish Vikings are forced from Chester into Wales.

Births
854
Cadell ap Rhodri, King of Seisyllwg (died 909)

Deaths
808
Cadell ap Brochfael, king of Powys
809
Elfodd, bishop of Gwynedd, who persuaded the Welsh church to adopt the Roman method of determining the date of Easter
844
Merfyn Frych, king of Gwynedd
855
Cyngen ap Cadell, king of Powys
871
Gwgon, king of Ceredigion and Ystrad Tywi
878
Rhodri the Great, king of Gwynedd and most of Wales (born c.820)

References

 
09
Wales